= 200 Monas =

2026 novel by Jan Saenz

- Author: Jan Saenz
- Language: English
- Publisher: Little, Brown and Company
- Publication date: March 3, 2026
- Publication place: New York
- Pages: 368
- ISBN: 978-0-316-59588-9

200 Monas is a novel by Jan Saenz. Sanez's debut, it was published on March 3, 2026, by Little, Brown and Company. The novel tells the story of a college senior who is forced to sell 200 doses of an experimental drug that gives women powerful orgasms.
